Westry is a village in Cambridgeshire, England. It lies to the northwest of March  on the A141 to Wisbech.

The Church of St Mary was  erected in 1873 to a design by Thomas Henry Wyatt. It is a Grade II listed building. The church was  gutted by fire in an arson attack on 15 March 2010
but reopened in 2014 after its insurers paid for a £2.2m renovation.

References

External links

St Mary's Church website

Villages in Cambridgeshire
Fenland District